Sims Township is a civil township of Arenac County in the U.S. state of Michigan. The population was 1,095 at the 2010 census.

Geography

Demographics
As of the census of 2000, there were 1,091 people, 503 households, and 353 families residing in the township. The racial makeup of the township was 97.80% White, 0.82% Native American, 0.37% Asian, 0.09% from other races, and 0.92% from two or more races. Hispanic or Latino of any race were 1.56% of the population.

There were 503 households, out of which 17.9% had children under the age of 18 living with them, 62.2% were married couples living together, 5.8% had a female householder with no husband present, and 29.8% were non-families. 26.4% of all households were made up of individuals, and 11.3% had someone living alone who was 65 years of age or older.  The average household size was 2.17 and the average family size was 2.56.

In the township the population was spread out, with 16.7% under the age of 18, 4.9% from 18 to 24, 19.9% from 25 to 44, 33.4% from 45 to 64, and 25.2% who were 65 years of age or older.  The median age was 51 years. For every 100 females, there were 100.6 males.  For every 100 females age 18 and over, there were 102.9 males.

The median income for a household in the township was $35,703, and the median income for a family was $41,932. Males had a median income of $43,750 versus $24,545 for females. The per capita income for the township was $25,135.  About 5.7% of families and 9.6% of the population were below the poverty line, including 23.5% of those under age 18 and 1.5% of those age 65 or over.

References

External links
Sims Township official website

Townships in Arenac County, Michigan
Townships in Michigan
Populated places on Lake Huron in the United States